Jason Crumb (born April 26, 1973) is a former Canadian football defensive back who played six seasons with the BC Lions of the Canadian Football League. He was drafted by the BC Lions in the fifth round of the 1999 CFL Draft. He played CIS football at University of Saskatchewan. Crumb is the  younger brother of former CFL player Mike Crumb. He was a member of the BC Lions team that won the 88th Grey Cup.

References

External links
Just Sports Stats
Okanagan Sun profile
Fanbase profile

1973 births
BC Lions players
Canadian football defensive backs
Living people
Players of Canadian football from British Columbia
Saskatchewan Huskies football players
Canadian football people from Vancouver